St. George's Bay may refer to the following places:

 St. George's Bay (Newfoundland and Labrador), Canada
 St. George's Bay (Nova Scotia), Canada
 Saint George Bay, Beirut, Lebanon
 St. George's Bay, St. Julian's, Malta
 St. George's Bay, Birżebbuġa, Malta
 St George's Bay, Auckland

See also
 St. George's Bay Company, later Sierra Leone Company, founded in 1790